The 2011–12 Belarusian Extraliga season was the 20th season of the Belarusian Extraliga, the top level of ice hockey in Belarus. 11 teams participated in the league, and Metallurg Zhlobin won the championship.

Regular season

Playoffs

External links
 Belarusian Ice Hockey Federation
 Season on hockeyarchives.info

Bel
Belarusian Extraleague seasons
Extraleague